Kəpənəkçi or Kepenekchi or Kyapyanyakchi or Kapanakchi or Kapanachkhi may refer to:
Kəpənəkçi, Goranboy, Azerbaijan
Kəpənəkçi, Zaqatala, Azerbaijan